Middle English Bible translations (1066-1500) covers the age of Middle English, beginning with the Norman conquest and ending about 1500. Aside from Wycliffe's Bible, this was not a fertile time for Bible translation. English literature was limited because French was the preferred language of the elite, and Latin was the preferred literary language in Medieval Western Europe.

Early partial translations
The Ormulum, produced by the Augustinian monk Orm of Lincolnshire around 1150, includes partial translations and paraphrases of parts of the Gospels and Acts of the Apostles from Latin into the dialect of the East Midlands. The manuscript is written in the poetic meter iambic septenarius.

Sample from the Ormulum (Luke 1:5):

{| cellpadding="8"
|         
|}

Paraphrases of many biblical passages are included in the Cursor Mundi, a world chronicle written about 1300.

Richard Rolle of Hampole (or de Hampole) was an Oxford-educated hermit and writer of religious texts. In the early 14th century, he produced English glosses of Latin Bible text, including the Psalms. Rolle translated the Psalms into a Northern English dialect, but later copies were written in Southern English dialects.

Around the same time, an anonymous author in the West Midlands region produced another gloss of the complete Psalms — the West Midland Psalms.

In the early years of the 14th century, a French copy of the Book of Revelation was anonymously translated into English.

Wycliffe's Bible
In the late 14th century, John Wycliffe produced the first complete English language Bible — often called Wycliffe's Bible. His New Testament was completed in 1380 and the Old Testament a few years later. It is thought that a large portion of the Old Testament was actually translated by Nicholas Hereford. Some 30 copies of this Bible survive, despite the fact that it was banned. From the time of King Richard II until the time of the English Reformation, Lollards who read Wycliffe's Bible were persecuted. Wycliffe's Bible was revised in the last years of the 14th century, perhaps by John Purvey. This edition was also banned and became even more popular than the first. Some 130 copies exist, including some belonging to the British royal family.  All dated copies are dated before the ban.

Sample of Wycliffe's translation:

Since the Wycliffe Bible conformed fully to Catholic teaching, it was rightly considered to be an unauthorized Roman Catholic version of the Vulgate text but with heretical preface and notes added. This slightly misleading view was held by many Catholic commentators, including Thomas More - and has continued to create confusion on the meaning of an authorised version of the  Bible and the purpose of authorising an  orthodox context for its translation.

Later partial translations

William Caxton translated many Bible stories and passages from the French, producing the  Golden Legend (1483) and The Book of the Knight in the Tower (1484).  He also printed The Mirror of the Blessed Life of Jesus Christ by Pseudo-Bonaventure, translated by Nicholas Love, OCart.

Legacy
All translations of this time period were from Latin or French. Greek and Hebrew texts would become available with the development of the Johann Gutenberg's movable-type printing press which coincided with the development of Early Modern English, making English a literary language, and would lead to a great increase in the number of translations of the Bible in the Early Modern English era.

Humanism of the Renaissance made popular again the study of the classics and the classical languages and thus allowed critical Greek scholarship to again become a possibility. Under the influence of Erasmus and his kind, with their new insistence on classical learning, there came necessarily a new appraisal of the Vulgate as a translation of the original Bible. Since the proclamation of the Latin Vulgate as authentic by the Council of Trent, there had been little new study of the original Biblical languages in Europe. But a renewed interest on the biblical languages threw scholarship into debate regarding the sources of the text. In the early 16th century Erasmus published a single volume of the Greek texts of the New Testament books, and republished more precise editions of this volume until his death. Erasmus's commentating and eventually re-writing a Latin New Testament (prior to publishing the one volume Greek New Testament) challenged the authority of the Latin Vulgate.

The other great event of that same century was the invention, in Europe, of printing with movable type. It was in 1455 that Johannes Gutenberg printed his first major work, an edition of the Latin Vulgate, now called the Gutenberg Bible. These developments would lead to the more fertile time for English translations in the Early Modern English period.

See also
Wycliffe's Bible
English translations of the Bible

References

11th-century Christian texts
12th-century Christian texts
13th-century Christian texts
14th-century Christian texts
15th-century Christian texts
Middle English literature
English, Middle